Summer Marjani Walker (born April 11, 1996) is an American R&B singer. In 2017, she signed to Love Renaissance and Interscope Records. The following year, she released the mixtape Last Day of Summer, which spawned the single "Girls Need Love", that became her first top 40 entry on the US Billboard Hot 100 chart following a remix featuring Drake. In October 2019, Walker released her debut studio album Over It, which spawned the US top 20 single "Playing Games".

Over It was released to universal acclaim from music critics, it also debuted at number-two on the Billboard 200 chart, breaking the record for the biggest streaming debut-week ever for a female R&B artist; while also being certified platinum by the Recording Industry Association of America (RIAA).

On November 5, 2021, she released her sophomore studio album Still Over It, which debuted at number-one on the Billboard 200. The album broke the record for most album streams in a single day by a female artist on Apple Music, and broke her previous record for largest streaming debut-week for a female R&B artist; while they also tied with Taylor Swift as the only two female artists that have held 18 songs concurrently on the Billboard Hot 100.

Her accolades include a Billboard Music Award, two Soul Train Music Awards, and a Grammy Award nomination.

Early life 
Walker was born in Atlanta, Georgia. From 2016 to 2018, she had a small cleaning business, and was also an exotic dancer in Atlanta before she taught herself how to play the guitar by watching tutorials on YouTube. Soon after, she began performing covers, posting various videos of herself to the platform.

Musical career

2018–2019: Career beginnings and Last Day of Summer 
Walker was discovered by a woman, who has the same name as her and works as the studio manager of an Atlanta-based label called Love Renaissance. In 2017, she signed with this label and Interscope Records. On October 19, 2018, Walker released her debut commercial mixtape, titled Last Day of Summer, supported by the lead single, "Girls Need Love". Walker's album contained her thoughts on love, doubt, and womanhood. Towards the end of 2018, Walker went on tour with 6lack on the From East Atlanta With Love Tour. Following the success of Walker's mixtape, Apple Music named Walker as its newest Up Next artist in 2019, and she became the number 8 R&B artist worldwide across the platform. On January 25, 2019, Walker released her first EP titled Clear, consisting of four tracks of acoustic recordings. On February 27, 2019, she released the remix to her song, "Girls Need Love", with Drake.

2019–2020: Breakthrough and Over It 
On August 23, 2019, Walker released a track, called "Playing Games" as the first official single for her debut studio album, titled Over It. The song, which contains an interpolation of Destiny's Child's number-one hit "Say My Name", was produced by London on da Track. On September 12, Walker revealed that Over It would be released on October 4 via LVRN and Interscope Records. Along with her album announcement, she shared the official artwork. Over It debuted at number two on the US Billboard 200 with 134,000 units in its first week. Its debut week marked the largest streaming week for an R&B album by a female artist, in terms of on-demand audio streams. The album also topped the R&B Albums chart for 14 nonconsecutive weeks, and as of July 2020, has yet to chart below number 7. Walker supported Over It with her accompanying The First and Last Tour, which kicked off on October 20. Due to her social anxiety, Walker canceled the remaining 20 out of 29 dates on the tour committing to 9 of them. On November 17, Walker won her first Soul Train Music Award for Best New Artist, she later received backlash from fans for her short speech and was accused of faking her social anxiety.

During early 2020, Walker collaborated with an American rapper 21 Savage on a song, titled "Secret". Walker also appeared on a remix for Justin Bieber's song Yummy. In April 2020, she was featured on Khalid's remix of "Eleven". On June 29, Walker announced the release of an EP, titled Life on Earth to be released on July 10. The announcement came a day after she performed "Session 32" and "Come Thru" with Usher at the 2020's BET Awards, where Walker was nominated for Best New Artist and Best Female R&B/Pop Artist. Life on Earth debuted atop the Billboard Top R&B Albums chart, becoming Walker's second number one. It also debuted at number 8 on the Billboard 200 becoming Walker's second top 10 project on the chart. Two tracks from the EP charted on the Billboard Hot 100, "Let It Go", and "My Affection" featuring PartyNextDoor, at numbers 84 and 86, respectively. "Come Thru" featuring Usher was certified platinum on August 20 by the Recording Industry Association of America (RIAA). A few days later, on August 25, her song "Body" was certified gold, "Playing Games" was certified two-time platinum, and "Girls Need Love" was certified three-time platinum by the Recording Industry Association of America (RIAA), respectively. On September 14, Walker was a musical guest on The Tonight Show Starring Jimmy Fallon, performing "Body" from her debut album Over It. The performance received praise from music-critics and fans alike, with Rolling Stone describing the performance as "beatific". On October 14, Walker won the Billboard Music Award for the Best Female R&B Artist at the 2020 ceremony, beating out Beyoncé and Lizzo. It became Walker's first Billboard Music Award win from three nominations respectively. Walker was also nominated for Top R&B Artist and Top R&B Album for Over It. On November 23, she released a repackaged version of the Over It album, titled Over It (Complete Edition). The repackaged version of the album features all 18 songs from the standard version of the album plus additional instrumentals, a capella versions, live renditions and more. On December 10, Walker's debut song, "Session 32" was certified gold and her collaboration featuring Jhené Aiko, titled "I'll Kill You" was certified platinum by the Recording Industry Association of America (RIAA), respectively. On the Billboard 200 year-end chart of 2020, Over It was the second best performing R&B album of the year behind The Weeknd's After Hours and was the seventeenth best performing album overall.

2021-present: Still Over It  
On November 5, 2021, Walker released her second album Still Over It which has since broken the record for biggest R&B debut on the US albums chart since Beyoncé's album Lemonade. The album surpassed 166,000 units within the first week of release. On November 29, Walker and Ari Lennox performed the song "Unloyal" together at the 2021 Soul Train Music Awards. 

The "No Love" extended remix featuring Cardi B was announced on March 21, 2022. On March 25, it was released along with a music video. In May, Walker was featured on Kendrick Lamar's track "Purple Hearts" from the 2022 album Mr. Morale & the Big Steppers, for which Walker earned her first Grammy Award nomination.

On September 28, 2022, Ciara released the single "Better Thangs", featuring Walker. The official music video, directed by Mia Barnes, premiered online on September 30.

Personal life 
While teaching herself guitar through YouTube tutorials, Walker worked as a stripper in an Atlanta strip club. In an interview with The Face she stated that the experience was "helping her grow out of her shell" and that it was "a fun experience".

Walker has well over 23 tattoos as of 2019, including face tattoos.

In November 2020, Walker announced that she was expecting her first child, with then-boyfriend London on da Track. Her daughter was born in March 2021. Months later, the pair ended their relationship. On June 25, 2022, Walker announced on Instagram Live that she was expecting her second child with then-boyfriend rapper Larry A.K.A. Lvrd Pharaoh. She gave birth to twin boys on December 30, 2022.

Artistry 
Walker has said that she draws inspiration from Amy Winehouse, Jimi Hendrix, and Erykah Badu. She noted Mary J. Blige as an Inspiration for the vulnerability and authenticity she displays in her own music, saying "back when Mary J. Blige and Faith Evans were making R&B, they had real pain and real stories. That’s why it was so good." Walker has also cited Lauryn Hill and D'Angelo as inspirations for her to experiment and explore new sounds within the R&B and Neo soul genres.

Discography 

Studio albums
Over It (2019)
Still Over It (2021)

Mixtapes and EPs
 Last Day of Summer (2018)
 Clear (2019)
 Life on Earth (2020)

Tours

Headlining 
The First and Last Tour (2019)
The Summer Walker Series (2022)

Awards and nominations 
American Music Awards

|-
| rowspan="3"| 2020
| Herself
| Favorite Soul/R&B Female Artist
| 
|-
| "Playing Games"
| Favorite Soul/R&B Song
| 
|-
| Over It
| Favorite Soul/R&B Album
| 
|-
| rowspan="2"| 2022
| Herself
| Favorite Soul/R&B Female Artist
| 
|-
| Still Over It
| Favorite R&B Album
| 
|-
|}

BET Awards

|-
|rowspan="2"|2020
|rowspan="4"|Herself
|Best New Artist
|
|-
|rowspan="3"|Best Female R&B/Pop Artist
|
|-
|rowspan="1"|2021
|
|-
|rowspan="2"|2022
|
|-
|"Unloyal"
|BET Her Award
|
|-

Billboard Music Awards

|-
| rowspan="3"| 2020
| rowspan="2"| Herself
| Top R&B Artist
| 
|-
| Top R&B Female Artist
| 
|-
| Over It
| Top R&B Album
| 
|-
| rowspan="3"| 2022
| rowspan="2"| Herself
| Top R&B Artist
| 
|-
| Top R&B Female Artist
| 
|-
| Still Over It
| Top R&B Album
| 
|-

Billboard Women in Music

|-
|rowspan="2"| 2022
|Herself
| Chart Breaker Award
|

Grammy Awards

|-
| 2023
| Mr. Morale & the Big Steppers
| Album of the Year (as featured artist and songwriter)
| 

iHeartRadio Music Awards

|-
| rowspan="3"| 2020
| rowspan="2"| Herself
| Best New R&B Artist
| 
|-
| R&B Artist of the Year
| 
|-
| "Girls Need Love" (with Drake)
| R&B Song of the Year
| 
|-
| rowspan="2"| 2021
| Herself
| R&B Artist of the Year
| 
|-
| "Playing Games" 
| R&B Song of the Year
| 

MTV Video Music Awards

|-
|rowspan="2"| 2020
|Herself
|Push Best New Artist
|
|-
|"Eleven" (with Khalid)
|Best R&B
|

Soul Train Music Awards

|-
|rowspan="3"|2019
|rowspan="2"|Herself
|Best New Artist
|
|-
|R&B/Soul Female Artist
|
|-
| "Girls Need Love (Remix)"
|rowspan="2"|Song of the Year
|
|-
|rowspan="5"|2020
|rowspan="2"| "Come Thru" (with Usher)
|
|-
|Best Collaboration
|
|-
|Over It
|Album of the Year
|
|-
|Herself
|Best R&B/Soul Female Artist
|
|-
|"Playing Games"
|The Ashford & Simpson Songwriter's Award
|
|-

References 

1996 births
Living people
Interscope Records artists
21st-century African-American women singers
African-American women singer-songwriters
American contemporary R&B singers
American people of English descent
Singer-songwriters from Georgia (U.S. state)